Norman Anthony Murdock (November 6, 1931 – September 11, 2010) was a former member of the Ohio House of Representatives and Common Pleas Judge.

References

Members of the Ohio House of Representatives
1931 births
2010 deaths